Redology  is the academic study of Cao Xueqin's Dream of the Red Chamber, one of the Four Great Classical Novels of China.  There are numerous researchers in this field; most can be divided into four general groups.  The first group are the commentators, such as Zhou Chun, Xu Fengyi, Chen Yupi, and others.  The second group is the index group, which mainly includes Wang Mengruan and Cai Yuanpei.  The third group are the textual critics, including Hu Shih and Yu Pingbo.  The final group are the literary critics, including Zhou Ruchang and Li Xifan.

History
A 1976 essay by Joey Bonner split the Chinese critical reception of the novel into five phases:
Pre-1791 Commentators on the pre-publication manuscripts, such as Rouge Inkstone and Odd Tablet, who mainly provide literary analysis of the first 80 chapters.
1791–1900 Post-publication questions over authorship of the addendum, speculation upon esoteric aspects of the book. After 1875 using the term "Redology" for the studies.
1900–1922 Political interpretations.
1922–1953 "New Redology" led by Hu Shih, approach questions of textual authenticity, documentation, dating, and a strong autobiographical focus. The labelling of previous periods as "Old Redology".
1954–current [1976] Marxist literary criticism, the book seen as a criticism of society's failures. Li Xifan's criticism of both Old Redology and Neo-Redologists such as Hu Shih and Yu Pingbo.

References

Further reading
Zhou Ruchang. Between Noble and Humble: Cao Xueqin and the Dream of the Red Chamber, edited by Ronald R Gray and Mark S. Ferrara. New York:Peter Lang, 2009

External links
Redology: the study of a classic Chinese masterpiece by Joyce Cheng, GB Times, July 24, 2013

Chinese literary schools
Chinese culture
Dream of the Red Chamber
Literary criticism